The following is the final results of the Iran Super League 1998/1999 basketball season. This season is the 1st season since the establishment of the Iran Super League.

Participated teams

Fajr Sepah Tehran
Foolad Mobarakeh Isfahan
Moghavemat Basij Shahrekord
Paykan Tehran
Rah Ahan Tehran
Shahrdari Gorgan
Tarbiat Badani Khorramabad
Zob Ahan Isfahan

Final standing
Zob Ahan Isfahan
Paykan Tehran
Fajr Sepah Tehran

External links
 Asia-Basket
 iranbasketball.org

Iranian Basketball Super League seasons
League
Iran